Princess Shōshi may refer to:

Princess Shōshi (1027–1105) (章子内親王), wife of Emperor Go-Reizei
Princess Shōshi (1195–1211) (昇子内親王), mother-in-law of Emperor Juntoku
Princess Shōshi (1286–1348) (奨子内親王), daughter of Emperor Go-Uda